Ezzat (also Romanized as ‘Ezzat) is a village in Kalej Rural District, in the Central District of Nowshahr County, Mazandaran Province, Iran. At the 2006 census, its population was 729, in 179 families.

References 

Populated places in Nowshahr County